Serdar Güneş (born 24 June 1987) is a Turkish footballer who was born in Berlin-Kreuzberg, West Germany. He plays for Türkyurt 1989 Berlin.

References

External links 
 
 Serdar Güneş at Fupa

1987 births
Living people
Footballers from Berlin
German people of Turkish descent
Turkish footballers
Association football midfielders
Berliner AK 07 players
Ankaraspor footballers
Karşıyaka S.K. footballers
İzmirspor footballers
Fatih Karagümrük S.K. footballers
Türkiyemspor Berlin players
Tennis Borussia Berlin players
People from Friedrichshain-Kreuzberg